Malkhaz Akishbaia (Abkhaz: Малхас Акшба, Georgian: მალხაზ აკიშბაია; born May 6, 1972) is an Abkhaz politician and the Chairman of Council of Ministers of the de jure Government of the Autonomous Republic of Abkhazia (GARA) from March 2006 to June 2009. 

Born in Gudava, Gali district, Abkhaz ASSR, Georgian SSR, in 1972, Akishbaia graduated from Kiev University in 1994 and finished his master's degree at University of Oxford. He worked for the ministries of economics (1999–2001) and defense (2004)  and for the National Security Council of Georgia (2004). From December 2004 to March 2006, he served as a minister of finances within the GARA and became the chair of this government in March 2006. His government was in exile in Tbilisi after the war with Russia in August 2008. He resigned on June 11, 2009, and was succeeded by Giorgi Baramia as the chairman of the GARA. Akishbaia was later appointed deputy Minister of Agriculture of Georgia.

References

External links 
 
Profile: Malkhaz Akishbaia Guardian News. Retrieved May 2, 2009.
Malkhaz Akishbaia accuses Russian militants of violating human right Georgian Times; (2009.02.04). Retrieved May 2, 2009.
Malkhaz Akishbaia News Explorer; updated on Monday, March 16, 2009. Retrieved May 2, 2009.

Upper Abkhazia
Abkhaz–Georgian conflict
1972 births
Living people
Government ministers of Abkhazia